Łabunie is a village in Zamość County, Lublin Voivodeship, in southeastern Poland. It is the seat of the gmina (administrative district) called Gmina Łabunie.

The village has a population of 1,670.

Sights
The landmarks of Łabunie are the Baroque Zamoyski Palace complex with an adjacent park, and the Our Lady of the Scapular church.

Sports
The local football club is Sparta Łabunie. It competes in the lower leagues.

Notable people
  (1902–1943), Polish Army officer, member of the Home Army and Cichociemni during World War II
 Andrzej Kowerski (1912–1988), Polish Army officer and SOE agent during World War II

Gallery

References

Villages in Zamość County
Kholm Governorate